Ayo Hulayat Omidiran, born 10 November 1965, is a Nigerian politician and former federal lawmaker representing the Ayedaade/Irewole/Isokan federal constituency in Osun State. She is a member of the All Progressive Congress. She is a native of Ikire in the Irewole local government area of Osun State.

Education 
She attended Ayedaade Grammar School Ikire, Osun State and obtained a West Africa School Certificate in 1980. She then proceeded to the Ahmadu Bello University, Zaria and graduated with a bachelor's degree in Biochemistry in 1985.

Career

Politics
She contested for the Federal House of Representatives for Ayedaade/Irewole/Isokan federal constituency in 2011 and was elected. She ran for re-election in 2015 and was re-elected under the umbrella of the APC. She has held various positions in the house including Deputy chairman, House Committee on Sports; member House Committee on Judiciary, Communications, Interior, Solid Minerals, Women Affairs and Women in Parliament.

Sports Administration
In 2002, she became a member of the Nigerian Football Association Board and remained there till 2005. Since 2006, she has been a member of the FIFA Women Committee. She became the proprietor of Omidiran Babe, a female football club in Osogbo, Osun State in 1997. In 2017, she was appointed the head of Nigeria Football Federation (NFF) Women Football Committee.

Personal life 
She is a fan of football. She sponsored the Ayedaade-Irewole-Isokan Federal Constituency Football Competition in early 2018 which climaxed with the finals at the Ayedaade High School, Ikire, Osun State.

References 

1965 births
Living people
All Progressives Congress politicians
Osun State politicians
Nigerian women in politics